Weston House was a Category I heritage building in Christchurch, New Zealand.

Weston House may also refer to:

 Ephraim Weston House, historic house in Reading, Massachusetts
 Jabez Weston House, historic house in Reading, Massachusetts
 John Henry Weston House, historic building in Cincinnati, Ohio

See also
 Fuller-Weston House
 Kings Weston House
 Weston Homestead
 Weston Park Museum

Architectural disambiguation pages